Tom Young Jr. (born October 8, 1971) is an American politician. He is a member of the South Carolina Senate from the 24th District, serving since 2012. He is a member of the Republican party.

References

Living people
1971 births
Republican Party South Carolina state senators
21st-century American politicians
People from Aiken, South Carolina
University of South Carolina alumni
University of South Carolina School of Law alumni